Valentin Krasnogorov (Russian: Валентин Красногоров, which is a pseudonym, his real name being Valentin Samuilovich Faynberg (Валентин Самуилович Файнберг)); born 20 December 1934, Leningrad, now St. Petersburg, is a Russian-Israeli playwright and writer.

Biography and Literature Work
Valentin Krasnogorov (20 December 1934, Leningrad, now St. Petersburg, Russia) is one of the best known modern Russian dramatists. Krasnogorov's first play, An Ideal Man, was written in 1976. His plays, The Dog, Small Tragedies, The Delights of Adultery, Somebody Must Leave, Now or Never, Love Medicine,  Let's Have Sex!, Several Hours From The Life of a Man and a Woman, That Weak Gentle Sex, The Bride's Room, A Cruel Lesson, etc. have been performed in more than 400 theaters of various countries, including the best Russian theaters, such as Maly Theater – Theater of Europe of Lev Dodin, Great Dramatic Theater, and Alexandrinsky Theater in St.Petersburg.

Krasnogorov's theatre pieces are written in different genres: comedies and tragedies, biting satire, grotesque, absurd, and lyricism.  Critics noticed that "Krasnogorov's plays cross borders easily".  For this reason, many of them have been translated into 30 foreign languages. His plays The Dog, Let’s Have Sex!,  The Delights of Adultery and  many others have been translated into English.

V. Krasnogorov is a member of the Writers Union of Russia;  member of the Russian Union of the Theater Workers;. His biography is included in the dictionaries "Marquis Who’s Who in the World", US,  "International Who's Who of Intellectuals", England, Cambridge, et al. He was President of the St. Petersburg Playwrights Association in 1987–1991. He is Doctor of Sciences, professor, author of books and papers on chemical engineering.

Plays

Plays Translated into English
Let's Have Sex!
Premiere After Party
Pelicans of the Wilderness
The Delights of Adultery
The Dog
The Fall of Don Juan
Running the Show
Ladies by AD
The Cruel Lesson
Small Tragedies
The Visit of a Young Lady

Plays in Russian
A Night in the Hotel
An Invitation to a Murder
Babel
Immodest Desires
Director of the open air shows
Love Medicine
Love to Distraction
Not Tomorrow, but Soon
Now or Never (Procession of Gnomes)
Premiere After-Party
Several Hours in the Life of a Man and a Woman
The Fair Show
Silent Niagara
Small Tragedies
Someone Must Leave
Song of Songs
That Weak, Gentle Sex
The Beilis Case
The Bride's Room
Gates of Paradise
The Legs of Woman Number Two
The Lot
Rendezvous on Wednesdays
Swan Song
The Woman Who didn't Exist
Women by the ad
Theatrical Comedy
Triangle Rolls

Books
Four Walls And One Passion (Theory of Drama)
Justus Liebig
Too Like The Lightning
The Delights of Adultery (Plays)
Premiere After Party (Plays) 2013
Rendez-vous on Wednesdays (Plays) 2015
Bride's Room (Plays) 2015
History of Russian and Soviet Censorship 2017
About Drama and Theater 2018

References

External links
Valentin Krasnogorov's personal site

1934 births
Russian writers
Living people